Luis Gino "Luigi" Santiago (September 12, 1977 – June 8, 2005) was a Filipino TV director.

Early life and education
Born to Roger and Irma Santiago in Quezon City, Luigi Santiago was raised in Belgium, Hong Kong, and New Jersey, United States. He studied film at New York University Tisch School of the Arts and also majored in Philippine Studies and minored in Theology.

He has two siblings; Nicolo and James Santiago (brother) and Armi Santiago (sister).

Career
Santiago popularity grew when he began directing Nginiig, a top-rated Philippines documentary-type TV show dealing with the paranormal. The series aired on ABS-CBN until 2006. In 2005, he began work on a film version of the show.

Death
Santiago died on June 8, 2005, at the age of 27 prior to the commencement of the filming of the film version of his TV show, Nginiig.

On the night of his death, Santiago, accompanied by his peers, visited Venezia club, an upscale bar club in Glorietta, located in Makati. While they rested after a few drinks, a commotion broke out in the venue between two sets of female patrons, causing the club's security team to intervene while an unidentified male customer left to retrieve a pistol in his car. Upon returning, the intoxicated customer fired indiscriminately wherein a bullet fatally hit Santiago in the chest. As the suspect fled, Santiago was rushed to Makati Medical Center where he was pronounced dead on arrival.

His funeral was held at Santuario de San Antonio Church, Forbes Park, Makati on June 14, 2005, before his cremation at Loyola Guadalupe at 12:00 noon on that day. His remains are stored in the same graveyard where he was cremated.

Filmography

TV director

Writer

Actor

Assistant director

References

1977 births
2005 deaths
Filipino television directors
People murdered in the Philippines
Filipino murder victims
Deaths by stabbing in the Philippines
Deaths by firearm in the Philippines
People from Quezon City
Artists from Metro Manila